Aamis is a 2019 Indian Assamese-language feature film written and directed by Bhaskar Hazarika. The film stars debutantes Lima Das and Arghadeep Baruah in the lead, supported by Neetali Das, Sagar Saurabh, and Manash K Das.

Aamis received its world premiere at the Tribeca Film Festival where it was nominated in five categories in the festival's "International Narrative" section. The film was released in India on 22 November 2019.

The story revolves around the life of two people, Nirmali, a doctor (played by Lima Das) and Sumon, an anthropology student (played by Arghadeep Baruah) as they develop an unusual friendship with each other, over their love of food. The film takes its time to develop the base, and then moves on to explore the themes of dark-psyche, with an ending that's commendable enough to be haunting and pleasant at the same time.

Plot

Sumon is a PhD student who researches meat eating habits of people in northeastern India, and cooks various meat dishes for his friends as a hobby. Nirmali is a doctor who feels unsatisfied with her married life, and constantly covers up for her friend Jumi who is having an extramarital affair. One day, the two meet when she has to treat Sumon's friend for indigestion, and form an acquaintance over an interest in food. Sumon cooks meat dishes for Nirmali, and takes her to various food places as their friendship progresses. Soon, he starts obsessing over her, to the detriment of his career. Nirmali's marriage worsens, and she spends more time with Sumon, but does not reciprocate his feelings.

As his obsession gets out of hand, Sumon approaches his friend Elias, a vet, to cut a part of his flesh for research purposes. In truth, he plans to cook his flesh and serve it to Nirmali, as a way to make their bond stronger. Nirmali inadvertently eats the dish, assuming it to be something else, and enjoys it more than anything she has ever tasted. When Sumon reveals what it really was, she is disgusted at first, but as time passes on, she discovers that she has started to crave human flesh.

Their relationship takes a horrifying twist, as they feed each other their flesh in turns. Nirmali's addiction gets worse, and she begins to crave a large portion of human flesh to satiate her hunger for good. To help her, Sumon kills a rickshaw driver but is caught in the act immediately. The police discover his connection to Nirmali through his phone and apprehend her as well. Their arrest causes a sensation, with the people terming them cannibals. In the final scene, as they both are presented in front of the media outside the police station with their faces covered, they hold hands.

Cast 
 Lima Das as Nirmali
 Arghadeep Baruah as Sumon
 Neetali Das as Jumi
 Sagar Saurabh as Elias Ahmad 
 Manash K Das as Dilip
 Utkal Hazowari as Inspector
 Chandan Bhuyan as Bora
 Samarjyoti Sarkar as Rickshaw puller
 Siddharth Boro as Eddie
 Momee Borah as Mina
 Jishnu Kashyap as Pikoo
 Uddipta K Bhattacharya as Suman's Friend

The film is a Signum and Metanormal production in association with Wishberry films

Awards- Best director- Singapore South Asian International Film Festival (SAIFF)

References

External links 
 

2019 films
Films set in Assam
2010s Assamese-language films